Marie-Hippolyte de Gueulluy, 2nd Marquess of Rumigny (1784-1871) was a French Pair and diplomate.

Family 
He was the son of Louis-Gabriel de Gueulluy, 1st Marquess of Rumigny (1761-1835), created Marquess by Louis XVIII, and Marie-Julie Hatte.
His brother was Marie-Théodore Gueilly, vicomte de Rumigny a famous French general, and Aide-de-camp of king Louis Philippe I and his sister was married to viscount Pierre Charles Dejean.

He married Caroline Mortier de Trévise, daughter of Edouard Mortier, Duke of Treviso and had three daughters:

 Marie-Louise-Eve de Gueulluy de Rumigny: married Ludovic, son of Charles-Joseph, 4th Duke d'Ursel.
 Marie-Antoinette-Julie-Eugenie de Gueulluy de Rumigny, married to Count Eduard de Sercey, ambassador.
 Marie-Julie-Sophie  de Gueulluy de Rumigny, married Aymard-Charles Hébert, Count of Beauvoir.

Career 
In 1805 he entered the French service of foreign diplomacy and became a close confidant of the King. In 1839 he was ambassador in Madrid, and was remarked to be an excellent diplomate.
He was Ambassador of the French king in Brussels and succeeded Louis Sérurier. Leopold I, King of the Belgians was son-in law of the French king.
He did retire after the French revolution of 1848 in Brussels, where he died at high age.

Honours 
 Grand Cordon of the Order of Leopold in 1857.
 Grand officer of the Legion of Honour
 Commander of the Order of the Polar Star.

References 

Ambassadors of France to Belgium
Ambassadors of France to Switzerland
Ambassadors of France to Spain
Gu
Commanders of the Order of the Polar Star
Peers of France
1784 births
1871 deaths